Peter Hans Dudley Ward (7 February 1913 – 13 January 2009) was an English athlete who competed for Great Britain in the 1936 Summer Olympics.

Career
He was born in Berlin, German Empire to an English father and German mother.

He studied Economics at the University of Cambridge and won a blue for athletics and a half-blue for cross-country. He was selected for the 1936 Olympics after setting a new 5,000 metres games record at the 1935 International Universities Games in Budapest and a new 3 miles record at the 1936 AAA championship.

In 1936 he finished eleventh the 1500 metres event, narrowly beating out fellow English runner Mike O'Donnell.

At the 1938 British Empire Games he won the silver medal in the 3 miles competition. He also participated in the 6 miles contest but did not finish the race.

Personal life
He was a stockbroker by trade before serving in the Second World War as a major in the Royal Artillery. After the war he made wooden toys at a workshop in London where he met his future wife Lona Fradeletto. Later in 1951 he and a friend, Cecil Chapman, set up Grant Instruments which made thermostatically controlled baths.

References

External links
sports-reference.com
Notice of death published in the Easter Daily Press 16 January 2009
Obituary published in the Eastern Daily Press, 23 January 2009
Obituary published in the Cambridge News 23 January 2009

1913 births
2009 deaths
English male middle-distance runners
British male long-distance runners
Olympic athletes of Great Britain
Athletes (track and field) at the 1936 Summer Olympics
Athletes (track and field) at the 1938 British Empire Games
Commonwealth Games silver medallists for England
Commonwealth Games medallists in athletics
British Army personnel of World War II
Royal Artillery officers
Medallists at the 1938 British Empire Games